Ann Marie Callaway (born October 28, 1949) is an American composer.

Life and career
Callaway was born in Washington, D.C., and grew up in Langley Park. She began her musical training in Baltimore under Grace Newsom Cushman and later studied with Alvin Etler at Smith College, George Crumb at University of Pennsylvania and with Jack Beeson, Fred Lerdahl and George Edwards at Columbia University, where she earned her D.M.A. in 1991.

Callaway's compositions have been widely broadcast in the U.S., and she is the subject of a documentary produced by Swedish Radio. She has received a Guggenheim Fellowship, commissions from the National Endowment for the Arts and the American Guild of Organists, and has held residencies at Yaddo, the MacDowell Colony, Voci and the Leighton Artist Colony in Banff. She is a recipient of the Fred Waring Award, and the Miriam Gideon Prize.

In 1984 Callaway was one of the founders of the New York Women Composers, Inc., an organization that supports women composers in the State of New York and the Greater New York City area through catalogs, events and grants.

Works
Her principal publisher is Subito Music.

Recordings
 The Gregg Smith Singers American Choral Masters Series Vol. IV contains Alleluia vidimus stellam (1980), a setting of the alleluia verse for Epiphany
 American Composers' Alliance at 50 (Opus One 143) contains Paraphrasis (1981), an organ fantasy on the tune INNSBRUCK, played by Haskell Thomson
 Four Elements: works for horn and piano by female composers (Lin Foulk, horn & Martha Fischer, piano) contains Four Elements (1974–77)
Music by Women: a Celebration (CPS-8714) (Rosemary Platt, piano; et al.) contains Theme and Seven Variations (1972)

References

External links
 Homepage
 2015 interview on choral writing
 Arsis Press composers' bios
 Subito Music catalogue
 Altarpiece for organ (1:23:50 Pipedreams episode #2114)

1949 births
Living people
American women classical composers
American classical composers
20th-century classical composers
Smith College alumni
University of Pennsylvania alumni
Columbia University School of the Arts alumni
20th-century American women musicians
20th-century American musicians
20th-century American composers
20th-century women composers
21st-century American women